Rough Riders of Cheyenne is a 1945 American Western film directed by Thomas Carr and written by Elizabeth Beecher. The film stars Sunset Carson, Peggy Stewart, Mira McKinney, Monte Hale, Wade Crosby and Michael Sloane. The film was released on November 1, 1945, by Republic Pictures.

Plot

A long simmering feud between the Carson and Sterling families erupts in western frontier town of Paradise Valley.  Sunset Carson (played by the real-life Sunset Carson) hears that his father has been murdered by the Sterling family, and heads for his home town in Arizona after having lived out of state for years.  Along the journey home he is attacked by an unidentified group of assailants.  Carson survives the ambush, and reaches his family home.  He is elated to learn that his father, Andy Carson (Eddy Waller), was wounded but survived the attack.  The senior Carson tells his son that the feud is still a real problem because he, Andy, has been falsely accused of killing Sterling clan member, Linc Sterling.  In an effort to end the years-long feud, Carson challenges Martin Sterling (Michael Sloane) to a showdown.  Just prior to the gunfight, Martin is ambushed by his own sister, Melinda (Peggy Stewart), so that she can save Martin and take his place in the shoot-out.  We learn that much of the ongoing feud is being fueled by a 3rd group of actors led by Pop Jordan (Wade Crosby), and both the Sterlings and the Carsons are being played.  Melinda is wounded in the shoot-out, but both families come together to defeat the Jordan gang.  In the end Sunset Carson and Melinda Sterling end up in each other's arms.

Cast 
 Sunset Carson as Sunset Carson
 Peggy Stewart as Melinda Sterling
 Mira McKinney as Harriet Sterling
 Monte Hale as Ward Tuttle
 Wade Crosby as Pop Jordan
 Michael Sloane as Martin Sterling
 Kenne Duncan as Lance
 Tom London as Sheriff Edwards
 Eddy Waller as Andy Carson
 Jack O'Shea as Benji
 Robert J. Wilke as Smoke
 Tex Terry as Flapjack
 Jack Rockwell as Stage Driver

References

External links
 
 

1945 films
American Western (genre) films
1945 Western (genre) films
Republic Pictures films
Films directed by Thomas Carr
American black-and-white films
1940s English-language films
1940s American films